Sayyid Baraka (1343–1403) was a holy man of the commercial city of Tirmidh, and spiritual teacher and friend to the 14th century Central Asian conqueror Timur. He was a fief of Andkhoy in Afghanistan, a town given to him by Timur. Timur is buried facing the Sayyid in the same mausoleum, Gur-e Amir, at Samarkand.

References

1343 births
1403 deaths
People from the Timurid Empire
Hashemite people
Shia Muslims
People of Arab descent